Boris Yakovlevich Levin-Kogan (December 31, 1918 – May 10, 1998) was a Soviet association football striker and later midfielder, who played predominantly for Zenit Leningrad. Levin-Kogan was born in Petrograd to a Jewish family.

After retiring, Levin-Kogan worked as a coach for youth teams.

Levin-Kogan died at the age of 79 and was buried in St. Petersburg's Smolensky Cemetery on Vasilievsky Island.

References

External links
Mikhail Grigoryev, Fighter without Fear or Fault, Dec. 26, 2003, Nevskoe Vremya
In Memoriam, March 6, 2007
Personal statistics

1918 births
1998 deaths
Footballers from Saint Petersburg
Jewish footballers
FC Zenit Saint Petersburg players
Soviet footballers
Association football forwards
Association football midfielders